High News is a 24-hour Bengali news channel launched by the company High Media Infotainment INDIA Ltd. in 2010. The company also runs a Bengali newspaper (Uttarer Saradin). The channel is on the INSAT-4A communications satellite at 83 degrees.

Sister concerns
High TV - The channel operates only in Maldah and in the Dinajpur Districts of West Bengal
Uttarer Saradin - A north Bengal daily morning  newspaper
Radio Milan 90.4 FM Jhargram. The station can be listened through Bangla Tune Android App, online, throughout the world.

References

External links

Bengali-language television channels in India
Satellite television
Television stations in Kolkata
2010 establishments in West Bengal
Television channels and stations established in 2010